Apsorrus or Apsoros ( may refer to:
 Osor, Croatia, a town
 Lošinj, an island adjacent to the town